Cecotropes, also called caecotrophs, caecal pellets, or night feces, are the product of the cecum, a part of the digestive system in mammals of the order Lagomorpha, which includes two families: Leporidae (hares and rabbits), and Ochotonidae (pikas). Cecotropes are passed through the intestines and subsequently reingested for added nutrients in a process known as "cecotrophy", "cecophagy", "pseudorumination", "refection", coprophagia or "coprophagy". Reingestion is also practiced by a few species of rodent (such as the beaver, capybara, and guinea pig), some marsupials (the common ringtail possum (Pseudocheirus peregrinus) and possibly the coppery ringtail possum (Pseudochirops cupreus)) and one species of primate (the sportive lemur (Lepilemur mustelinus)).

Production 
The process by which cecotropes are produced is called "hindgut fermentation". Food passes through the esophagus, stomach, small intestine, where nutrients are initially absorbed ineffectively, and then into the colon. Through reverse peristalsis, the food is forced back into the cecum where it is broken down into simple sugars (i.e. monosaccharides) by bacterial fermentation. The cecotrope then passes through the colon, the anus, and is eliminated by the animal and then reingested. The process occurs 4 to 8 hours after eating. This type of reingestion to obtain more nutrients is similar to the chewing of cud in cattle.

Disorder 
The process of cecotrophy can have irregularities. An animal can fail to assimilate nutrients (vitamins, amino acids) synthesized by microorganisms in the cecotrope.

See also
Coprophagia 
Rabbit eating habits

References

Lagomorphs